Boat Story is an upcoming television series made for BBC One and Amazon Freevee by the All3Media production company, Two Brothers Pictures. Written and co-directed by Jack and Harry Williams, it is set to star Daisy Haggard, Paterson Joseph, Tcheky Karyo, Joanna Scanlan, Craig Fairbrass and Phil Daniels.

Synopsis
Cocaine is found on a boat by two hard-up strangers, Janet (Haggard) and Samuel (Joseph), who agree to sell it and split the proceeds but quickly find themselves entangled with the police, and a sharp-suited gangster known as 'The Tailor' (Karyo).

Cast
 Daisy Haggard as Janet
 Paterson Joseph as Samuel 
 Tcheky Karyo as The Tailor
 Joanna Scanlan
 Craig Fairbrass
 Phil Daniels

Production
The project was announced by the BBC and Amazon Freevee in November 2022 as a six-part series, with production by Two Brothers Pictures of All3Media. Written by Harry and Jack Williams, the actors Haggard, Joseph, Daniels, Scanlan, Karyo and Fairbrass were announced as the cast. The Williams brothers will direct episodes, as will Alice Troughton and Daniel Nettheim.

Filming
Filming took place on Majuba Beach on the Yorkshire coast in November 2022.
Filming also took place in Redcar Selby and Halifax in 2023.

Broadcast
Boat Story is set to premiere on BBC One and BBC iPlayer in the United Kingdom, and Amazon Freevee in the United States.

References

External links

BBC crime drama television shows
British crime television series
2020s British crime television series